Ribnica Dio is a village in the municipality of Zavidovići, Bosnia and Herzegovina. It is located on the banks of the Krivaja River.

Demographics 
According to the 2013 census, its population was 1,016.

References

Populated places in Zavidovići